A butte is an isolated hill with steep sides and a flat top.

Butte may also refer to:

Places
 Butte (Besançon), area of Besançon, France
 Buttes, Neuchâtel
 Butte, Alaska
 Butte, Montana
 Butte Mountains, Nevada
 Butte, Nebraska
 Butte, North Dakota
 Butte, the former name for Butte City, Glenn County, California
 Butte Lake (California)

People
 Antoinette Butte, French founder of Girl Guiding
 Atul Butte, American physician
 George C. Butte, American jurist, educator, and politician
 John Butte (disambiguation)
 Rüdiger Butte (1949–2013), German politician

Other uses
 USS Butte (disambiguation)
 Butte potato

See also
 BUT (disambiguation)
 Bute (disambiguation)
 Butt (disambiguation)
 Butts (disambiguation)
 Butte City (disambiguation)
 Butte County (disambiguation)
 Butte Creek (disambiguation)
 La Butte (disambiguation)